The Hemerobiiformia are a suborder of insects in the order Neuroptera. The phylogeny of the Neuroptera was explored in 2014 using mitochondrial DNA sequences. The results indicate that the traditional Hemerobiiformia are paraphyletic, meaning that not all the members of the clade are considered to belong to it, in particular since it would include all the Myrmeleontiformia, with which the Hemerobiiformia were traditionally contrasted. The Osmyloidea, usually included in Hemerobiiformia, actually seem to represent a more ancient lineage basal to Hemerobiiformia as well as Myrmeleontiformia. The broken-up group is shown in the cladogram:

References

External links 

 
Insect suborders